With United Nations Security Council resolution 541, adopted on 18 November 1983, after reaffirming Resolution 365 (1974) and Resolution 367 (1975), the Council considered Northern Cyprus' decision to declare independence legally invalid.

It called upon both parties to cooperate with the Secretary-General, and urged other Member States not to recognize Northern Cyprus, while only recognizing the Republic of Cyprus as the sole authority on the island.

The resolution was adopted by 13 votes to one against (Pakistan) and one abstention from Jordan.

See also

 Cyprus dispute
 List of United Nations Security Council Resolutions 501 to 600 (1982–1987)
 United Nations Buffer Zone in Cyprus
 Turkish invasion of Cyprus
 United Nations Security Council Resolution 550

References

External links
 
Text of Resolution

 0541
 0541
November 1983 events
1983 in Cyprus